Tammy Barker (born 1969 or 1970) is a Canadian retired Paralympic swimmer. She competed at the 1988 Paralympics and is from Edmonton, Alberta.

References

1970s births
Living people
Medalists at the 1988 Summer Paralympics
Paralympic swimmers of Canada
Swimmers from Edmonton
Paralympic gold medalists for Canada
Paralympic medalists in swimming
Swimmers at the 1988 Summer Paralympics
Canadian female freestyle swimmers